Bimla Kashyap Sood (born 26 February 1942) is an Indian politician, Social worker and a Member of Parliament (Rajya Sabha) elected from Himachal Pradesh, India being a Bharatiya Janata Party candidate.

Early life and education
Kashyap Sood was born in Chail village in Solan district in the Indian state of Himachal Pradesh. She is a graduate of Punjab University, Punjab in Bachelor of Arts. She married Shrawan Kashyap Sood on 11 June 1962. She has one son and two daughters.

Career
In 1990s, Kashyap Sood was actively involved in literacy campaign in Himachal Pradesh through a Non-Government Organisation "Lotus Welfare Society". In 1999, she founded "Manavi", an N.G.O. aimed at family counselling and women's welfare. During 1998–2003, she held Councillor post in Municipal Corporation, Shimla, Director at "Himachal Pradesh State Co-operative Bank", "Himachal Pradesh State Handicrafts and Handloom Corporation Ltd." and director of "Mahila Vikas Nigam", Shimla.

She was elected to Rajya Sabha in April, 2010. She served as a member of Consultative Committee for the Ministry of Women and Child Development, Committee on water resources and Committee on transport, tourism and culture.

References

Social workers
Rajya Sabha members from Himachal Pradesh
Bharatiya Janata Party politicians from Himachal Pradesh
Women in Himachal Pradesh politics
1942 births
Living people
Articles created or expanded during Women's History Month (India) - 2014
People from Solan district
Indian women educational theorists
20th-century Indian educational theorists
Social workers from Himachal Pradesh
21st-century Indian women politicians
21st-century Indian politicians
20th-century Indian women scientists
Women educators from Himachal Pradesh
Educators from Himachal Pradesh
20th-century women educators
Women members of the Rajya Sabha